Paula Jean Biggar (born 9 May 1955) is a Canadian politician.

She was elected to the Legislative Assembly of Prince Edward Island in the 2007 provincial election. She represented the electoral district of Tyne Valley-Linkletter and is a member of the Liberal Party until she was defeated in the 2019 Prince Edward Island general election. She previously held the title of "Deputy Speaker" of the House.

A native of Prince County, Biggar received a diploma in Public Administration from the University of Prince Edward Island and was an educational assistant and municipal councillor prior to being elected. She lives in Bideford.

On May 20, 2015, Biggar was appointed to the Executive Council of Prince Edward Island as Minister of Transportation, Infrastructure and Energy. She was given an additional role as Minister responsible for the Status of Women when Tina Mundy resigned from cabinet the following day.

References 

Living people
Members of the Executive Council of Prince Edward Island
People from Prince County, Prince Edward Island
Prince Edward Island Liberal Party MLAs
Prince Edward Island municipal councillors
Women MLAs in Prince Edward Island
University of Prince Edward Island alumni
21st-century Canadian politicians
21st-century Canadian women politicians
Women government ministers of Canada
1955 births